The 2009 Dominion Curling Club Championship was held November 25–29 at the St. George's Golf and Country Club in Etobicoke, Toronto, Ontario.

The event was the first event of its kind in Canada.

Men's event

Grey pool

Blue pool

Playoffs

Women's event

Grey pool

Blue pool

Playoffs

External links

Dominion Curling Club Championships, 2009
Canadian Curling Club Championships
2009 in Toronto
Etobicoke
Curling in Toronto
November 2009 sports events in Canada